Events from the year 1982 in China.

Incumbents 
 Chairman of the Chinese Communist Party – Hu Yaobang (until September 12)
 General Secretary of the Chinese Communist Party – Hu Yaobang
 Chairman of the National Congress – Ye Jianying (head of state)
 Premier – Zhao Ziyang 
 Chairman of the Chinese People's Political Consultative Conference – Deng Xiaoping
 First Vice Premier – Wan Li

Governors 
 Governor of Anhui Province – Zhou Zijian 
 Governor of Fujian Province – Ma Xingyuan 
 Governor of Gansu Province – Li Dengying 
 Governor of Guangdong Province – Liu Tianfu 
 Governor of Guizhou Province – Su Gang 
 Governor of Hebei Province – Li Erzhong then Liu Bingyan  
 Governor of Heilongjiang Province – Chen Lei 
 Governor of Henan Province – Dai Suli (acting) then Yu Mingtao (acting) 
 Governor of Hubei Province – Han Ningfu 
 Governor of Hunan Province – Sun Guozhi 
 Governor of Jiangsu Province – Hui Yuyu then Han Peixin 
 Governor of Jiangxi Province – Bai Dongcai then Zhao Zengyi  
 Governor of Jilin Province – Yu Ke then Zhang Gensheng
 Governor of Liaoning Province – Chen Puru (until April)
 Governor of Qinghai Province – Zhang Guosheng then Huang Jingbo  
 Governor of Shaanxi Province – Yu Mingtao 
 Governor of Shandong Province – Su Yiran then Liang Buting 
 Governor of Shanxi Province – Luo Guibo 
 Governor of Sichuan Province – Lu Dadong/Yang Xizong (starting December)
 Governor of Yunnan Province – Liu Minghui 
 Governor of Zhejiang Province – Li Fengping

Events 

 2nd Golden Rooster Awards
 12th Politburo of the Chinese Communist Party
 Qidong (meteorite) fell to earth
 Third National Population Census of the People's Republic of China
 Three Communiqués

Births 
 May 5 – Jia Dandan
 July 27 – Tang Li
 April 3 – Liang Lei
 April 14 – Zhao Shengbo
 October 9 – Nian Yun

Deaths 
 Yang Tingbao
 Huang Xianfan
 Wei Ming
 Mok Kwai-lan
 Pei Wenzhong
 Liu Lanbo

See also 
 1982 in Chinese film

References